The Prague Writers' Festival (PWF) is an annual literary festival in Prague, Czech Republic, taking place every spring since 1991. In 2005 the festival was also held in Vienna. Many of the events are broadcast via the internet. International literary figures to have appeared at the festival include John Banville, Lawrence Ferlinghetti, Salman Rushdie, Irvine Welsh, William Styron and Nadine Gordimer.

History
The festival's origins are in London in the late 1970s, when PWF president Michael March began organising poetry readings at Keats House. As permitted by the Helsinki Accords, writers from the Eastern Bloc were invited to participate. After the fall of the Berlin Wall, the readings relocated to Prague, due to its reputation as "a natural host and meeting place for writers". Writers from various countries were invited to Prague as a crossroads between East and West to present their work and their culture to an international audience in the form of discussions and readings. The first Prague Writers’ Festival took place at Wallenstein Palace in May 1991 and was themed "Wedding Preparations in the Country". Over the next twenty years, Prague Writers' Festival became an increasingly important event in Prague's cultural life.

Themes
 1991 - Wedding Preparations in the Country
 1992 - Paradise lost
 1993 - 1995 - without theme
 1996 - Ancient evenings
 1997 - dedicated to Samuel Beckett
 1998 - dedicated to Bohumil Hrabal
 1999 - dedicated to Vladimir Holan
 2000 - dedicated to Jaroslav Seifert
 2001 - dedicated to Primo Levi: "If Not Now, When?"
 2002 - dedicated to Jean Genet
 2003 - dedicated to William S. Burroughs: "We don't report the news. We write it."
 2004 - dedicated to Joseph Roth: "I don't know where I'm going."
 2005 - dedicated to Giacomo Casanova: "Our ignorance becomes our sole resource"
 2006 - dedicated to Arthur Miller: "There is no life without ideals."
 2007 - Dada East
 2008 - Laughter and Forgetting
 2009 - 2001 Nights: The Art of Storytelling
 2010 - Heresy and Rebellion
 2011 - Some Like It Hot
 2012 - Only the Future Exists
 2013 - The Birth of Nations
 2014 - Love and Hate
 2015 - Fear
 2016 - Crime and Punishment
 2017 - The Fire Next Time
 2018 - Live — Evil
 2019 - Beauty Saves the World
 2020 - We are Condemned to Hope

Activities

Festival program
The main focus of the festival is the public readings. Every evening during the event, authors take the stage for an "audience with" event and read excerpts from their work, each writer reading in their native language while Czech and English translations are provided simultaneously. Authors also appear in other supporting events such as book signings, concerts, or film projections. Each day a new conversation, dedicated to a literary or political subject, is held. The hour-long discussions are followed by questions from the audience.

Media outreach
The main media partner of the PWF is the British daily newspaper The Guardian, which often refers to festival events, issues, and news on its cultural pages. Many of the events are streamed live on the internet and the festival's website also hosts an archive of previous events. The festival's archives are available to the public online, in a database of Czech and English texts. One of the aims of the PWF Foundation is to secure funding for the full digitisation of its archives.

Other projects
As a cultural foundation, Prague Writers’ Festival is engaged year-round in other cultural activities. The PWF Foundation publishes books and helps to organize concerts (such as Ed Sanders and the Plastic People of the Universe) and movie screenings, as well as art exhibitions (such as Dada East? and The World in 1968).

The Prague Writers’ Festival offers discount tickets and other benefits to high school classes, and also works in partnership with principals and teachers at local schools to organise the annual Walter Serner Short Story Prize. By virtue of its focus on humanities, languages, and literature, the festival also has a long-standing partnership with several Czech universities and with the University of New York in Prague. It also cooperates with students from Charles University, Masaryk University and the Prague College of Journalism to arrange activities for the festival.

Notable guests

Nobel Prize Winners
 Gao Xingjian (PWF 2009, Nobel Prize 2000)
 Wole Soyinka (PWF 2006, Nobel Prize 1986)
 Nadine Gordimer (PWF 2004, Nobel Prize 1991)
 Harold Pinter (PWF 1999, Nobel Prize 2005)
 José Saramago (PWF 1994, Nobel Prize 1998)
 Herta Müller (PWF 1999, Nobel Prize 2009)
 Derek Walcott (PWF 2011, Nobel Prize 1992)

Man Booker Prize Winners
 Margaret Atwood (Canada) - Man Booker Prize 2000 for The Blind Assassin, PWF 2008
 Nadine Gordimer (South Africa) – Man Booker Prize 1974 for The Conservationist, PWF 2004
 Arundhati Roy (India) - Man Booker Prize 1997 for The God of Small Things, PWF 2003
 Yann Martel (Canada) - Man Booker Prize 2002 for Life of Pi, PWF 2003
 Salman Rushdie (India, United Kingdom) - Man Booker Prize for Midnight's Children, PWF 2001
 Ian McEwan (United Kingdom) - Man Booker Prize 1998 for Amsterdam, PWF 2001
 John Banville (Ireland) - Man Booker Prize 2005 for The Sea, PWF 2001

Pulitzer Prize Winners
 William Styron (USA) - Pulitzer Prize 1968 for The Confessions of Nat Turner, PWF 2006
 Jeffrey Eugenides (USA) - Pulitzer Prize 2003 for Middlesex, PWF 2003
 Richard Ford (USA) - Pulitzer Prize 1996 for Independence Day, PWF 2000
 Michael Cunningham (USA) - Pulitzer Prize 1999 for The Hours, PWF 1994
 Junot Díaz (Dominican Republic) - Pulitzer Prize 2008 for The Brief Wondrous Life of Oscar Wao, PWF 2011

See also
 Designblok

References

External links
 Prague Writers Festival Official Site

Cultural festivals in the Czech Republic
Festivals in Prague
Czech literature
Literary festivals in the Czech Republic